The women's 87 kilograms competition at the 2022 World Weightlifting Championships was held on 14 December 2022.

Schedule

Medalists

Records

Results

References

Women's 87 kg
World Championships